The  by Kōen, the teacher of Hōnen, is a Japanese historical text compiled at the end of the twelfth century.

Overview 
The Fusō Ryakuki is a Japanese historical text compiled at the end of the Heian period. It is also called the Fusō-ki or Fusō-shū. It was compiled by the Enryaku-ji Tendai monk , who died in 1169. It is written in kanbun, in an annal style.

The complete work originally chronicled Japan's history from the reign of Emperor Jimmu in the seventh century BCE to Kanji 8 (1094 CE). Using surviving extracts, however, the Ryakukis accounts of the reigns of Emperor Jimmu through Emperor Heizei can be reconstructed to some extent.

It supposedly also included an account of the Age of the Gods but this has not survived and its contents are unknown.

References

Citations

Works cited 

 
 
 
 

Heian period in literature
Japanese chronicles
History books about Buddhism
History books of the Heian Period